Raymond Passello (12 January 1905 in Geneva– 16 March 1987) was a Swiss footballer who played for Switzerland in the 1934 FIFA World Cup. He also played for Servette FC. He was also part of Switzerland's squad at the 1928 Summer Olympics, but he did not play in any matches.

References

1905 births
1987 deaths
Swiss men's footballers
Switzerland international footballers
1934 FIFA World Cup players
Association football forwards
Servette FC players
Footballers from Geneva